Scaled may mean:

 Scaled Composites (often abbreviated as Scaled), formerly the Rutan Aircraft Factory
 Scaled Aviation Industries of Lahore, Pakistan, a Light Sports Aircraft Manufacturer
 Something which has undergone a scale transformation
 Scale model#Scales
 Scaling (geometry)

See also
Scale (disambiguation)